John Richard Sandbrook OBE (13 August 1946 – 11 December 2005) was Director of the International Institute for Environment and Development from 1976 to 1980.

Sandbrook was born in Bath, the son of a naval officer. He was educated at Dauntsey's School and the University of East Anglia. He was President of the Union of UEA Students in 1967/8. For five years he was an accountant at Arthur Andersen.

He was a co-founder of Friends of the Earth UK, and served as Managing Director from 1974 to 1976. He was awarded an OBE in the 1990 New Year Honours. He was a non-executive director of the Eden Project in Cornwall, featuring biomes and gardens, from 1999 to 2003.

He married Mary Wray in 1970; they had two sons.

Sandbrook died of cancer aged 59.

References

External links
Richard Sandbrook Trust
About Richard Sandbrook, Richard Sandbrook Trust

1946 births
2005 deaths
Friends of the Earth
People educated at Dauntsey's School
People from Bath, Somerset
Alumni of the University of East Anglia
Officers of the Order of the British Empire